Muhammad Azeem bin Mohd Fahmi (born 29 April 2004) is a Malaysian sprinter. He is the current Malaysian 100 metres outdoor record holder with a time of 10.09 seconds. He currently holds the Malaysian national under-20 record in the 200 metres with a time of 20.83 seconds.

Early life and education 
Muhd Azeem Fahmi was born on 29 April 2004 in Teluk Intan, Perak to Fahmi Tajuid and Norazah Ibrahim. Azeem achieved 6 A's in his SPM examinations. In January 2023, Azeem moved to the United States to further his studies in exercise physiology and kinesiology at Auburn University, Alabama. Since his move he has been training under Zimbabwean coach Ken Harnden.

Career 

Azeem won gold at the 2019 ASEAN School Games in the 200m final with a time of 21.63 seconds.  In August 2022, he broke the national 100m record held by Khairul Hafiz Jantan at the 2022 World Athletics U20 Championships with a time of 10.09 seconds during the heats. He also went on to break his own national under-20 200m record with a time of 20.83 seconds.

Azeem broke the men’s 60m indoor sprint national record previously held by Watson Nyambek with a time of 6.63 seconds in the semi-finals of the 2023 Texas Tech Open meet and dip it down further with 6.62 seconds in Tiger Paw Invitational meet final on 11th Feb 2023.

References

External links 
 

2004 births
Living people
People from Perak
Southeast Asian Games medalists in athletics
Southeast Asian Games silver medalists for Malaysia